Julie M. Lassa (born October 21, 1970) is a former Democratic Party member of the Wisconsin State Senate, who represented the 24th District from April 2003 to January 2017. She was a member of the Wisconsin Assembly for the 71st District from 1998 through 2003.

Early life, education and career
Born in Stevens Point, Wisconsin, Lassa graduated from Stevens Point Area Senior High School and graduated with a B.S. in political science and public administration from UW-Stevens Point in 1993. She served as the executive director of the Plover Area Business Association and as the chair of the Portage County Democratic Party.

Lassa is a member of the Heart of Wisconsin Business and Economic Alliance, Marshfield Area Chamber of Commerce and Industry, Business and Professional Women, and the Portage County, Wisconsin Business Council. Lassa was elected as a member of the Dewey Town Board from 1993 to 1994.

Wisconsin legislature
Lassa served as a member of the Wisconsin State Assembly from 1998 through 2003. She successfully ran in 2003 for the Wisconsin State Senate and served there until 2017.

2011 Wisconsin protests

During the protests in Wisconsin, Lassa, along with the 13 other Democratic State Senators, left the state to deny the State Senate a quorum on Governor Scott Walker's controversial "Budget Repair" legislation.

2010 U.S. Congressional campaign

She was endorsed by Mike Tate, the Chairman of the Democratic Party of Wisconsin. Duffy defeated Lassa with a strong showing in the November 2010 general election.

Personal life
Lassa resides in Stevens Point, Wisconsin with her husband John Moe, City Clerk for the City of Stevens Point, and their three children, Taylor, Madison, and Lily.

References

External links
Senator Julie Lassa at the Wisconsin State Legislature
constituency site
 
Campaign contributions at OpenSecrets.org
Campaign contributions (2008) at the Wisconsin Democracy Campaign
24th Senate District, Senator Lassa in the Wisconsin Blue Book (2005–2006)

1970 births
Living people
Democratic Party members of the Wisconsin State Assembly
People from Stevens Point, Wisconsin
University of Wisconsin–Stevens Point alumni
Democratic Party Wisconsin state senators
Women state legislators in Wisconsin
21st-century American politicians
21st-century American women politicians
20th-century American politicians
20th-century American women politicians